De' ä' dans på Brännö brygga (It is Dance at Brännö Jetty) is a 1941 waltz written by Lasse Dahlquist. The song has been sung at Allsång på Skansen (Sing-along at Skansen). Brännö is an island in Gothenburg archipelago, and every summer it's dance at Brännö brygga.

References 

"Den svenska sångboken"

1941 songs
Songs written by Lasse Dahlquist
Swedish-language songs
Songs about Gothenburg